Justice   V. D.  Tulzapurkar (9 March, 1921 – 1 October, 2004) B.A., LL.B., Attorney-at-Law, was a judge of the Supreme Court of India from 30 September 1977 until 9 March 1986.

He received his education at Wilson High School, Wilson College and Government Law College, Bombay. He became Advocate of the Bombay High Court on 1 December 1942. He was appointed Judge of the City Civil Court and Additional Sessions Judge, Bombay on 16 July 1956 and became Principal Judge, City Civil Court and Sessions Judge, Bombay on 19 April 1962.

He became Judge of the Bombay High Court with effect from 21 December 1963 till  29 September 1977.

He died on 1 October 2004.

References

1921 births
2004 deaths
Judges of the Bombay High Court
Marathi people
Justices of the Supreme Court of India
20th-century Indian judges